Michael Anthony Boland (born December 16, 1949) is a Canadian cinematographer and former professional ice hockey player. He played two NHL games with the Philadelphia Flyers during the 1974–75 season and also played 41 WHA games with the Ottawa Nationals, before beginning to work as a television and documentary film camera operator.

Boland won a Primetime Emmy Award (shared with Vic Sarin) for his work on the 1992 episode "Strange Relations" of the television series Millennium: Tribal Wisdom and the Modern World. He and Sarin also won a Gemini Award for Best Photography in an Information/Documentary Program or Series for the same episode.

In 2012 he published his memoir, Through the Lens of My Eye: Adventures of a Documentary Camerman.

He was codirector with Roberto Verdecchia of "Gorilla Doctors", a 2014 episode of The Nature of Things which was a Canadian Screen Award nominee for Science or Nature Documentary Program or Series at the 4th Canadian Screen Awards.

References

External links

 

Canadian cinematographers
Canadian documentary film directors
Primetime Emmy Award winners
1949 births
Living people
Canadian ice hockey right wingers
Dayton Gems players
FoPS players
HIFK (ice hockey) players
Sportspeople from Montreal
Ottawa Nationals players
Philadelphia Firebirds (AHL) players
Philadelphia Firebirds (NAHL) players
Philadelphia Flyers players
Richmond Robins players
Springfield Kings players
Toronto Varsity Blues ice hockey players
Undrafted National Hockey League players
Ice hockey people from Quebec
Canadian expatriate ice hockey players in Finland
Canadian Screen Award winners